Turbo haynesi, common name Hayne's turban, is a species of sea snail, marine gastropod mollusk in the family Turbinidae.

Description
The shell grows to a length of 27 mm.

Distribution
This marine species occurs off Western Australia to Queensland, Australia and off New Caledonia.

References

 Reeve, L.A. 1848. Monograph of the genus Turbo. pls 1-13 in Reeve, L.A. (ed). Conchologia Iconica. London : L. Reeve & Co. Vol. 4
 Preston, H.B. 1914. Description of new species of land and marine shells from the Montebello Island, Western Australia. Proceedings of the Malacological Society of London 11: 13-18 
 Iredale, T. 1929. Queensland molluscan notes, No. 1. Memoirs of the Queensland Museum 9(3): 261–297, pls 30-31 
 Thiele, J. 1930. Gastropoda und Bivalvia. pp. 561-596 in Michaelsen, W. & Hartmayer, R. (eds). Die Fauna Südwest-Australiens. Jena : Gustav Fischer Vol. 5
 Ponder, W.F. 1978. The unfigured Mollusca of J. Thiele. 1930 published in Die Fauna Sudwest-Australiens. Records of the Western Australian Museum 6(4): 423-441 
 Wilson, B. 1993. Australian Marine Shells. Prosobranch Gastropods. Kallaroo, Western Australia : Odyssey Publishing Vol. 1 408 pp
 Alf A. & Kreipl K. (2003). A Conchological Iconography: The Family Turbinidae, Subfamily Turbininae, Genus Turbo. Conchbooks, Hackenheim Germany.
 Williams, S.T. (2007). Origins and diversification of Indo-West Pacific marine fauna: evolutionary history and biogeography of turban shells (Gastropoda, Turbinidae). Biological Journal of the Linnean Society, 2007, 92, 573–592.

External links
 

haynesi
Gastropods of Australia
Gastropods described in 1914